Mitrella blanda is a species of sea snail in the family Columbellidae, the dove snails.

References

blanda
Gastropods described in 1844